Badangi is a village in Vizianagaram district of the Indian state of Andhra Pradesh. It is located in Badangi mandal.

Demography
Badangi mandal has a population of 49,384 in 2011. Males consists of 24,881 and females 24,503 of the population. According to 2001 census average literacy rate is 49%, below the national average of 59.5%. Male literacy rate is 60% and that of females 38%.

Badangi Airstrip
There is a historic Airstrip near Badangi village. It was used as command base for Royal Air Force in British India.
The construction was started in 1942 and completed in 1943. It was constructed by Mackenzie company and was the second biggest RAF base after the one at Lahore. It was built on 221-acres of land and consisted of two runways in a cross formation. It had control-tower overlooking both the runways, a separate underground armament depot that housed the 250-pound torpedo bombs, many underground bunkers, hangars, staff quarters and a natural pond for the fire-fighting.

The RAF squadron at Badangi comprised Supermarine Spitfire fighters, Hawker Hurricane fighters, Avro Lancaster bombers, Vickers Wellington bombers, Bristol Beaufighter bombers and Douglas Dakota transport aircraft.

It was closed in 1946, as the war was over. Today, the huge seven-inch thick solid concrete runway that is being used by the local farmers for threshing the grains. All the other structures have been demolished.

Institutions
 There is Andhra Pradesh Social Welfare Residential Junior College in Badangi maintained by Social welfare department of Andhra Pradesh Government.

References 

Villages in Vizianagaram district
Mandal headquarters in Vizianagaram district
Uttarandhra